Kalateh-ye Mohammad Hoseyn Khan (also Romanized as Kalāteh-ye Moḩammad Ḩoseyn Khān, Kalateh Mohammad Hosein Khan, and Kalāteh Muhammad Husain Khān; also known as Kalāt-e Moḩammad Ḩoseyn Khān and Ordūgāh Shahīd Moṣṭafa) is a village in Baqeran Rural District, in the Central District of Birjand County, South Khorasan Province, Iran. At the 2006 census, its population was 18, in 6 families.

References 

Populated places in Birjand County